Spokeo is a people search website that aggregates data from online and offline sources.

History
Spokeo was founded in 2006 by four graduates from Stanford University—Mike Daly, Harrison Tang, Ray Chen, and Eric Liang. The original idea of aggregating social media results came from Tang. The four founders developed the idea in early 2006, using Tang's parents’ basement. On November 5, 2006, the site officially launched, after attracting an initial round of angel investment in the "low hundreds of thousands" according to co-founder Ray Chen.

The site has evolved to become an information-gathering website that offers various options for finding information about people. It purports to know, among other things, one's income, religion, spouse's name, credit status, the number of people in the household, a satellite shot of the house and its estimated value. The company's revenues for 2014 were $57 million, and as of 2015, the site had 18 million users.

Technology
Spokeo utilizes deep web crawlers to aggregate data. Searches can be made for a name, email, phone number, username or address. The site allows users to remove information about themselves through an "opt-out" process that requires the URL of the listing and a valid email address. The firm  aggregates information from public records and does not do original research into personal data. It aggregates marketing data approximations into the data it finds from social media and online registry sites. The company gives users access to 12 billion public records.
From the Spokeo main landing page, typing in any reverse-search email address - even a completely made up one will result in a suggestion that information has been found and the searcher will be invited to take out a subscription to see the search results.

Privacy complaints and legal troubles
Larry Ponemon has raised concerns about the general practice of gathering personal data and the potential for identity theft. When Spokeo released version 4 of its website, KGPE-TV aired a piece on Spokeo outlining local law enforcement agencies' concerns that the site would enable cyberstalking. They reported that credit information was being included in some online profiles and that Spokeo had a feature that provided photos of private residences. Search results on Spokeo offered to provide a "credit estimate" and "wealth level" information, as well as information about a target's mortgage value, estimated income, and investments. Spokeo CEO Harrison Tang has said that credit information is not actually available through Spokeo.

The Federal Trade Commission (FTC) fined Spokeo $800,000 for marketing information to human resource departments for employment screening without adhering to consumer protection provided by the Fair Credit Reporting Act (FCRA)—the first FTC fine involving personal data collected online and sold to potential employers. Under the settlement, in addition to the $800,000 fine for Spokeo's FCRA and FTC violations, the firm is required to submit compliance reports to the FTC for twenty years.

A class action lawsuit was filed against Spokeo seeking injunctive relief and monetary damages for the alleged violation of the Fair Credit Reporting Act, and the lawsuit was initially dismissed for lack of standing. The case was appealed and Spokeo lost. Spokeo petitioned for a writ of certiorari from the Supreme Court of the United States, which agreed to hear the case on April 27, 2015. On May 16, 2016, the Supreme Court announced judgment in favor of the plaintiffs in Spokeo, Inc. v. Robins.

The Court found that concrete harm had not been established by the 9th Circuit Court, only particularized harm ("the requirement that an injury affect the plaintiff in a personal and individual way", "individualized rather than collective"—quotes from the brief). In the brief, most of the judgement is based on law established in the Fair Credit Reporting Act of 1970. As to the concrete requirement from this act, it seems from the brief that the court based its analysis on the chain of evidence lacking as to whether a Robins's potential employer had used Spokeo to make the determination, and on the failure of the 9th Circuit Court to properly consider whether the risk created to Robins from the incorrect information was enough to satisfy the concreteness requirement. The case was vacated at the Supreme Court and remanded to the 9th Circuit Court for further consideration.

On August 15, 2017, the Ninth Circuit again allowed Robins' lawsuit to proceed.  Judge Diarmuid O'Scannlain, joined by the same judges as before, now found that Robins had alleged a sufficiently concrete harm to establish an injury in fact under the Constitution.  Relying on an amicus curiae brief filed by the Consumer Financial Protection Bureau in support of Robins, Judge O'Scannlain determined that publishing even flattering inaccuracies could harm a job seeker. Spokeo again petitioned the Supreme Court for a writ of certiorari, but this was denied.

Philanthropy
Spokeo has donated money to scholarship funds for US university students. The company also runs Search Angels, which uses "volunteers who use Spokeo to help those touched by adoption, foster care and other family separations to find long-lost family members while also offering emotional support."

Criticism

Spokeo and similar services have been criticized because of the danger caused by listing the personal information and physical addresses of unwitting people openly online, and for profiting off the exploitation of personal data.

See also 
 Federated search
 Information broker
 Privacy laws of the United States

References

External links
 Spokeo official website
Spokeo.pl portal informacyjny

Companies based in Pasadena, California
Internet properties established in 2006
Internet search engines
Online person databases
Data collection